Suzanne Carbotte is a marine geophysicist known for her research on the formation of new oceanic crust.

Education and career 
Carbotte has an H.B.Sc in geology and physics from the University of Toronto (1982). Following college, she went to art school before starting at Queen's University where she earned an M.Sc. geophysics in 1986. In 1992, she earned her Ph.D. in marine geophysics from the University of California. Carbotte started at Lamont–Doherty Earth Observatory as a post-doctoral research fellow and in 2007 she was named the Bruce C. Heezen Senior Scientist.

In 2015, Carbotte was elected a fellow of the American Geophysical Union, and the citation reads:

Research 

Carbotte uses sonar to map the seafloor and applies the resulting data to understanding of how tectonic plates move over time and space. She has characterized spreading of tectonic plates in regions characterized by fast versus slow spreading rates, and conducted research on the East Pacific Rise and the Juan de Fuca Ridge. In the Cascadia Subduction Zone off the western coast of the United States, Carbotte uses seismic data to examine water and sediments found within oceanic crust, and quantifies the level of stress in different regions of the tectonic plates. In 2021, Carbotte lead a cruise on the RV Marcus G. Langseth to estimate the scale of earthquakes in the Pacific Northwest with a particular focus on why the tectonic plates in the region have been unexpectedly quiet in recent geological time.

Carbotte also works to retain scientific data and make it readily-available to the public. Her work with the Global Multi-Resolution Topography (GMRT) is a Digital Elevation Model that provides high resolution maps of the seafloor on global scales. She has worked within the confines of the Marine Geoscience Data System generating data during the Ridge 2000 program, data from Antarctica and the Southern Ocean, and within the United States Antarctic Program Data Center

Selected publications

Awards and honors 

 Francis Birch lecture, American Geophysical Union (2008)
Fellow, American Geophysical Union (2015)

References

External links 
 

Fellows of the American Geophysical Union
Women geologists
Seismologists
University of Toronto alumni
Queen's University at Kingston alumni
University of California alumni
Lamont–Doherty Earth Observatory people
Year of birth missing (living people)
Living people
Marine geophysicists